The 1989 Boston University Terriers football team was an American football team that represented Boston University as a member of the Yankee Conference during the 1989 NCAA Division I-AA football season. In their second season under head coach Chris Palmer, the Terriers compiled a 4–7 record (4–4 against conference opponents), finished in sixth place in the Yankee Conference, and outscored opponents by a total of 292 to 271.

Schedule

References

Boston University
Boston University Terriers football seasons
Boston University Terriers football